The Corrieyairack Pass (Scottish Gaelic – Màm Choire Ghearraig) is a 770 m (2526 ft) high pass in the Scottish Highlands at . It is notable for the presence of one of General Wade's military roads, built at the time of the Jacobite risings in the eighteenth century.

Military road

This pass would be relatively obscure were it not for General Wade's military road built over it in 1731, between Fort Augustus in the Great Glen to the north and Melgarve in Strath Spey in the south. This path almost became the site of a major battle in the Jacobite rising of 1745, when Prince Charles Edward Stuart encamped at the height of the pass, and the Government commander approached from the south to quell the rebellion. The Government forces retreated due to the strongly entrenched position of the Jacobite Forces.

The pass today

The Highland Council states that the Corrieyairack Pass is not maintained as a public road, and is not suitable for use as one, so it advises against using motor vehicles on the pass. The road surface is made of stone, though it is now very eroded and damaged, and in many places the original paving has been lost. It is now used primarily by hikers and mountain bikers, as well as access for workers maintaining the adjacent electricity pylon line.

The military road is designated a Scheduled Ancient Monument with separate listings for each section, these being from south-east to north-west:
Melgarve to Allt Ruadh 
Allt Ruadh to watershed 
watershed to Allt Lagan a'Bhainne 
Allt Lagan a'Bhainne to Black Burn 
Black Burn to Connachie Burn 
Connachie Burn to Culachy

References

Roads in Scotland
Mountain passes of Scotland
Scheduled monuments in Scotland
Geography of Inverness
Badenoch and Strathspey
Transport in Highland (council area)
Landforms of Highland (council area)